Sidi Bibi is a small town and rural commune in Chtouka-Aït Baha Province of the Souss-Massa-Drâa region of Morocco. At the time of the 2014 census, the commune had a total population of 23,909 people living in 5,108 households. It is famous for its dish, tagine, which people from around the world come to eat.

References

Populated places in Chtouka Aït Baha Province
Rural communes of Souss-Massa